Rambla may refer to:

Rambla, a synonym of Arroyo (creek)
La Rambla, Barcelona, a street in central Barcelona
Rambla de Catalunya, Barcelona, a major street in Barcelona
La Rambla, Córdoba, municipality in the province of Córdoba, Spain
Rambla de Ferran-Estació, neighborhood in Lleida, Catalonia, Spain
Rambla d'Aragó, Lleida, an important thoroughfare in the Universitat district of Lleida, Catalonia, Spain
Rambla Just Oliveras (Barcelona Metro), station of the Barcelona Metro
Rambla of Montevideo, the avenue that goes all along the coastline of Montevideo, Uruguay
Rambla del Poyo, 41 km Rambla in the Province of Valencia, Spain
La Rambla (climb), a famously difficult sport climb in Siurana, Catalonia (Spain)

See also
San Juan de la Rambla, Santa Cruz de Tenerife a municipality in the northern part of the island of Tenerife
Rambala
Ramla
La Rambla (disambiguation)

an:Rambla
ca:Rambla
de:Rambla
it:Rambla